Ibrahim Haseljić (born 14 January 1998) is a Bosnian handball player for RK Gorenje Velenje and the Bosnian national team.

He represented Bosnia and Herzegovina at the 2020 European Men's Handball Championship.

References

1998 births
Living people
Bosnia and Herzegovina male handball players
Sportspeople from Tuzla
Expatriate handball players
Bosnia and Herzegovina expatriate sportspeople in Slovenia